Rolfe D. Mandel (born August 25, 1952) is a Distinguished Professor of archaeology in the Department of Anthropology at the University of Kansas as well as Senior Scientist and Executive Director of the Odyssey Geoarchaeological Research Program at the Kansas Geological Survey.  Initially trained as a geographer, he has been a major figure in defining the subdiscipline of geoarchaeology and has spent the last thirty years focusing on the effects of geologic processes on the archaeological record.  His primary research interests include geoarchaeology, Quaternary soils, geology, paleoecology, and paleoenvironmental reconstruction in the Great Plains region of the United States as well as the Mediterranean.  Over the years, Mandel has participated in numerous research projects and has served as an editor to multiple journals and a book.  His work has been key in promoting an interdisciplinary approach in archaeology, geology, and geography.

Early life and education
Rolfe Mandel was born in San Antonio, Texas.  In 1971, he moved to Austin, Texas to pursue a bachelor's degree (B.S.) in physical geography from the University of Texas at Austin. He completed this with Honors in 1975.  He remained in Austin for a year to work as a research associate in the resource planning section of the Texas Parks and Wildlife Department.  Trained as a geographer, Mandel's early work dealt with land use and natural resource planning.  In 1976, he moved to Lawrence, Kansas to begin graduate study in the Geography Department at the University of Kansas.  It was around this time that his research interests began to shift from traditional physical geography, to a focus on paleoenvironments and archeology.  He was awarded a masters (M.A.) through the Geography Department in 1980 for his work on paleosols in Texas, and a Ph.D. in 1991 through the university's Special Studies program for work on Holocene landscape evolution in southwestern Kansas.

Professional career

Geography
Following the completion of his B.S., Mandel spent a year working as a research associate for the resource planning section at the Texas Parks and Wildlife Department.  His primary job was to assist in an environmental analysis for the Houston-Galveston region in southeast Texas.  After moving to Kansas in 1976, he was hired as a research assistant to do similar work on land and resource sustainability by University of Kansas's Institute for Social and Environmental Studies (ISES).  In June 1978, he started working at ISES full-time as a research associate and coordinator of the Environmental Research Program, a position he would hold until 1986.  For the next four years, Mandel worked as a physical geographer until a cultural resource management project with the Kansas Historical Society changed the trajectory of his career.

Geoarchaeology

Mandel's professional career in geoarchaeology began in 1982.  For the rest of his time as coordinator of the Environmental Research Program, he focused predominantly on projects relating to archaeology and cultural resource management in the Midwest.  He would also work in Egypt this year, the first of several projects in the Mediterranean.  Mandel left his position at ISES in 1986 and in 1987 became a lecturer in the Geography Department at the university.  During this time he was also acting as a consulting geomorphologist on a number of archaeological projects, most notably 'Ain Ghazal in Northwestern Jordan and the Akrotiri-Aetokremnos Rockshelter on the island of Cyprus; both were multi-year projects with work at ‘Ain Ghazal continuing to this day.

From 1989 to 1993 he left Kansas to take an assistant professor position at the University of Nebraska at Omaha.  He returned to Kansas in 1993 as an adjunct professor while continuing to consult in the academic and private sector. It was around this time that he would join the research team investigating the mound complex site known as Watson Brake in northern Louisiana.  Often cited as the earliest mound site in North America (5,400 B.P.), Mandel was key in establishing the chronology of the mounds construction.  Almost a decade later in 2002, Mandel would take a position at the Kansas Geological Survey (KGS) as a part-time project coordinator for the Geoarchaeology Research Program.  He was also acting as the Editor-in-Chief of Geoarchaeology: An International Journal at this time; a position he stepped down from in 2004, but continued his affiliation with the journal first as a Co-Editor (2004-2007), and currently as an Associate Editor (2007–present).

After a year at the KGS and over a decade in the Geography Department, Mandel would switch positions again, this time moving to the Department of Anthropology and becoming an associate scientist at the KGS in 2003.  He would also take charge of the newly created Odssey Geoarchaeological Research Program, an ongoing research project through the KGS funded by Joseph and Ruth Cramer to find the earliest inhabitants of the Great Plains and western Midwest.  Mandel was made a full professor of the Anthropology Department in 2009, and promoted to Senior Scientist at the KGS the same year.  Some of his more recent work includes contributing to a team studying the cultural landscape and qanat systems of southern Afghanistan's Kandahar province.  Using remote sensing techniques the researchers were able to locate qanat irrigation systems and archaeological resources in an otherwise inaccessible part of the world.  In 2014 Mandel was awarded the title of University Distinguished Professor by the University of Kansas, a position he currently holds along with his research duties at KGS, and acting as an Associate Editor for Geoarchaeology.

Odyssey Geoarchaeological Research Program
The Odyssey Geoarchaeological Research Program is a privately endowed research program funded by Joseph and Ruth Kramer and housed within the Kansas Geological Survey.  It has been under the direction of Rolfe Mandel since its inception in 2003, its primary goal being “to search for evidence of the earliest people to inhabit the Central Great Plains and western portions of the Midwest, and to gain a better understanding of late the Pleistocene and early Holocene paleoenvironments that affected those people”.  This is done through laboratory methods at the KGS's Isotope Preparation Laboratory and Geoarchaeology and Paleoenvironmental Research Lab, in addition to field work in Kansas, Nebraska, Colorado, South Dakota, and Missouri.   The program funds a number of thesis and dissertation research related to Paleo-Indian archaeology and geoarchaeology in addition to supporting graduate and undergraduate students involved in summer field investigations.

Selected publications
Mandel, R.D., L.R. Murphy, and M.D. Mitchell, 2014. Geoarchaeology and Paleoenvironmental Context of the Beacon Island Site, an Agate Basin (Paleoindian) bison kill in Northwestern North Dakota, USA. Quaternary International 342:91-113.
Mandel, R.D., 2008. Buried Paleoindian-age Landscapes in Stream Valleys of the Central Plains, USA. Geomorphology 101:342-361.
Simmons, A.H., and R.D. Mandel, 2007. How Old is the Human Presence on Cyprus? Science 317: 1679.
Mandel, R.D., J.S. Jacob, and L.C. Nordt, 2007. Geoarchaeology of the Richard Beene Site. In Archaeological and Paleoecological Investigations at the Richard Beene Site (41BX831), South Central Texas, edited by A.V. Thoms and R.D. Mandel, pp. 27–60. Center for Ecological Archaeology, Reports of Investigations No. 8, Texas A&M University, College Station, Texas.
Mandel, R.D. (Editor), 2006. Guidebook of the 18th Biennial Meeting of the American Quaternary Association. Technical Series 21, Kansas Geological Survey, University of Kansas, Lawrence.
Mandel, R.D., 2006. The Effects of Late Quaternary Landscape Evolution on the Archaeology of Kansas. In Kansas Archaeology, edited by R.J. Hoard and W.E. Banks, pp. 46–75. University Press of Kansas, Lawrence, Kansas.
Mandel, R.D., S. Holen, and J.L. Hofman, 2005. Geoarchaeology of Clovis and Potential Pre-Clovis Cultural Deposits at the Kanorado Locality, Northwestern Kansas. Current Research in the Pleistocene 22:56-57.
Mandel, R.D., and J.L. Hofman, 2003. Geoarchaeological Investigations at the Winger Site: A Late Paleoindian Bison Bonebed in Southwestern Kansas, U.S.A.  Special Issue on Paleoindian Geoarchaeology: Part II. Geoarchaeology: An International Journal 18:129-144.
Mandel, R.D., and A.H. Simmons, 2001, Prehistoric Occupation of Late Quaternary Landscapes Near Kharga Oasis, Western Desert of Egypt. Geoarchaeology: An International Journal 16:95-117.
Mandel, R.D., and E.A. Bettis III, 2001. Use and Analysis of Soils by Archaeologists and Geoscientists: A North American Perspective. In Earth Science in Archaeology, edited by Paul Goldberg, Vance T. Holliday, and C. Reid Ferring, pp. 173–204. Kluwer Academic/Plenum, Norwell, Massachusetts.
Mandel, R.D., 2000. The History of Geoarchaeological Research in the Central Plains of Kansas and Northern Oklahoma. In Geoarchaeology in the Great Plains, edited by R.D. Mandel, pp. 79–136. University of Oklahoma Press, Norman.
Mandel, R.D., 1998. Archaeological Geology. Geotimes 43:49-51.
Mandel, R.D. and A.H. Simmons, 1997. Geoarchaeology of the Akrotiri Aetokremnos Rockshelter, Cyprus. Geoarchaeology: An International Journal 12:567-605.
Mandel, R.D., 1995. Geomorphic Controls of the Archaic Record in the Central Plains of the United States. In Archaeological Geology of the Archaic Period in North America, edited by E. A. Bettis III, pp. 37–66. Geological Society of America Special Paper 297.
Mandel, R.D., 1994. Holocene Landscape Evolution in the Pawnee River Basin, Southwestern Kansas. Kansas Geological Survey and the Kansas State Historical Society, Bulletin 236, 117 p.
Mandel, R.D., 1992. Soils and Holocene Landscape Evolution in Central and Southwestern Kansas: Implications for Archaeological Research.  In Soils in Archaeology:Landscape Evolution and Human Occupation, Vance T. Holliday, editor, pp. 41–100. Smithsonian Institution Press, Washington, D.C.
Mandel, R.D. and A.H. Simmons, 1988. A Preliminary Assessment of the Geomorphology of ‘Ain Ghazal’.  In The Prehistory of Jordan. Gerrard and H. Gebel, editors, pp. 431–436, B.A.R.  International Series 396(i), Oxford, England.
Mandel, R.D., and C.J. Sorenson, 1982. The Role of the Western Harvester Ant (Pogonomyrmex occidentalis) in Soil Formation.  Soil Science Society of America Journal 46(4):785-788.

Notes

1952 births
Living people
American archaeologists
University of Kansas faculty
University of Texas at Austin College of Liberal Arts alumni